Joshua Brewster Bolten (born August 16, 1954) is an American lawyer and politician. Bolten served as the White House Chief of Staff to U.S. President George W. Bush, replacing Andrew Card on April 14, 2006. Previously, he served as the Director of the Office of Management and Budget from 2003 to 2006. 

Since 2017, he has been president and CEO of the Business Roundtable.

Early life and education
Bolten is Jewish, the son of Analouise (née Clissold) and Seymour Bolten. His father worked for the CIA and his mother taught world history at George Washington University. He graduated from St. Albans School, and served on the school's board until 2007.

Bolten attended Princeton University, where he studied in the Woodrow Wilson School of Public and International Affairs and served as class president and president of The Ivy Club. He graduated in 1976. Bolten completed a 152-page long senior thesis titled "Judicial Selection in Virginia." He graduated with a J.D. from Stanford Law School in 1980 and served as an editor of the law review.

Career
Under President George H.W. Bush (1989-1993), Bolten was general counsel to the Office of the United States Trade Representative for three years and Deputy Assistant to the President for Legislative Affairs for one year.

Bolten was Executive Director for Legal and Government Affairs at Goldman Sachs in London from 1994 to 1999. He served as policy director for the 2000 George W. Bush presidential campaign

Under George W. Bush he served as Deputy Chief of Staff for Policy at the White House from 2001 to 2003.  Bolten served as Director of Office of Management and Budget (OMB) from 2004-2006. In 2006 he was appointed as White House Chief of Staff.  He was the second Jewish person to hold that top position. (Ken Duberstein, who held that post during the Reagan administration, was the first, and Rahm Emanuel, who held the post in the Obama administration, was the third).

Bolten served as White House Chief of Staff from 2006 until 2009. He recruited Henry Paulson—then-CEO of Goldman Sachs—to serve as Treasury Secretary, based on his former employment at the firm. In addition, he recruited Tony Snow to work as White House Press Secretary, offered Rob Portman the opportunity to succeed him as OMB Director, and brought his OMB deputy Joel Kaplan into the White House as Deputy Chief of Staff for Policy.

Later career

Bolten became the John L. Weinberg/Goldman Sachs & Co. Visiting Professor at the Princeton School of Public and International Affairs in September 2009, teaching courses on the federal budget and international trade and financial regulation. In March 2010, Bolten was appointed a member of the board and co-chair of the Clinton Bush Haiti Fund, which has raised $36 million to date for immediate earthquake relief and long-term recovery efforts in the Caribbean country.

In July 2011, Bolten co-founded Rock Creek Global Advisors, an international economic and regulatory policy consulting firm, where he served as managing director until 2017.

In January 2017, Bolten was named president and CEO of the Business Roundtable, a conservative lobbying organization. He replaced former Michigan Governor John Engler in the role.

Personal life
Bolten plays bass guitar in a band called The Compassionates. In 2015, Bolten married Ann Kelly.

References

External links
Biography in Stanford Law School magazine
Who2 profile of Bolten
Friends discuss Bolten's college experience at dailyprincetonian.com.
Yale Daily News: Bolten's Former Yale Colleagues Discuss the New Bush Tap by Andrew Mangino and Maggie Reid

C-SPAN Q&A interview with Bolten, May 22, 2005

|-

|-

|-

1954 births
21st-century American politicians
Directors of the Office of Management and Budget
George W. Bush administration personnel
George W. Bush administration cabinet members
Goldman Sachs people
Jewish American members of the Cabinet of the United States
Lawyers who have represented the United States government
Living people
Place of birth missing (living people)
Princeton School of Public and International Affairs alumni
St. Albans School (Washington, D.C.) alumni
Stanford Law School alumni
Washington, D.C., Republicans
White House Chiefs of Staff
White House Deputy Chiefs of Staff